English singer-songwriter Ed Sheeran has recorded songs for five studio albums and 17 EPs.

Before releasing his first studio album, Sheeran released eight EPs while not being signed by a label, titled The Orange Room, Ed Sheeran, Want Some?, You Need Me, Loose Change, Songs I Wrote with Amy, Live at the Bedford, and No.5 Collaborations Project, with the latter gaining mainstream attention for having reached number 2 in the iTunes chart without any promotion or label, selling over 7,000 copies in the first week. Later that year, Sheeran was signed to Asylum Records.

"The A Team" was released as the lead single for Sheeran's first studio album, + (pronounced "plus"), in 2011. The album included songs such as "You Need Me, I Don't Need You", "Lego House", and "Give Me Love".

Sheeran released his second studio album x (pronounced "multiply") in 2014. The album spawned the hits "Thinking Out Loud", "Photograph", "Don't" and included the track "I See Fire", also included on the soundtrack for second installment of The Hobbit film series.

Sheeran's third studio album, ÷ (pronounced "divide"), was released in 2017. The album release was preceded by the singles "Castle on the Hill" and "Shape of You". It also included other major hits, such as "Perfect", "Galway Girl", and "Happier". The accompanying concert tour became the highest-grossing concert tour of all time.

The follow-up to his 2011 EP, No.6 Collaborations Project was released in 2019. Sheeran collaborated with various artists on all the album's tracks. The album included the tracks "I Don't Care" with Justin Bieber, "Beautiful People" featuring Khalid, and "South of the Border" featuring Camila Cabello and Cardi B.

In 2021, Sheeran announced his fourth solo studio album = (pronounced "equals") to be released 29 October 2021. The album was preceded by the singles "Bad Habits" and "Shivers". Upon release, the album was accompanied by a music video for the single "Overpass Graffiti". The album debuted at number one on the Billboard 200. Ed then announced on March 1, 2023 that his fifth studio album, − ("Subtract") would release on May 5, 2023.

Songs

References

Sheeran, Ed